Melik Arslan Bey (r. 1454-1466), was the seventh bey of the Beylik of Dulkadir. He was the third son of Dulkadiroğlu Süleyman Bey (r. 1442-1454).

Reign
Uzun Hasan, the sultan of Akkoyunlu a Turkmen sultanate in East Anatolia, invaded Kharput and defeated Arslan, devastating his capital Elbistan. This forced Arslan to flee to Cairo to seek support.

Death
Melik Arslan, who established relations with the Mamluk Sultanate, was killed in 1466 while worshipping at the mosque in Elbistan by an assassin of the Mamluk Sultan Sayf ad-Din Khushqadam, with assistance of Arslan's  brother Shah Budak. 

Mamluks had begun to suspect Melik Arslan of trying to come under the rule of the Ottomans.

Ibn Taghribirdi twice mentioned the assassination of Melik Arslan. At the first time, he deemed it unnecessary to name the culprit, in another place he reported that, according to rumors,  the killer was sent by the Mamluk Sultan to Elbistan. 

Abdulbasit al-Malati and Muhammad ibn Iyas indicated that Melik Arslan was killed by order of the Sultan.

The Mamluks appointed Shah Budak as the new bey in 1465.

Issue
Melik Arslan Bey’s only known child was Emir Arslan Bey.

Other children include:

Malik Arslan Bey, lived: 1457-1469

Al-Nabik Arslan Bey, lived: 1457-1491

Muhamed Arslan Bey, lived: 1458-1502

References

See also
Beylik of Dulkadir

Dulkadirids
15th-century monarchs in Asia
Turkic rulers
1466 deaths
Year of birth unknown